Leslie George Frise FRAeS (2 July 1895 – 26 September 1979) was a British aerospace engineer and aircraft designer; he designed the Type 156 Bristol Beaufighter. He was involved in the development of aircraft and gun-turret hydraulic systems.

Early life
Frise was born in Bristol, Gloucestershire, an area which is now known as South Gloucestershire. He was educated at Bristol Grammar School and gained a BSc degree in Mechanical Engineering from the University of Bristol. Early in First World War he served in the Royal Naval Air Service (RNAS).

Boulton Paul Aircraft
In 1915 he started Boulton Paul Aircraft's first aircraft factory at Mousehold Heath, Norwich to make 100 Sopwith Camels. The company was previously a general manufacturing firm that had begun in 1873.

Bristol Aeroplane Company
In August 1915, Frank Barnwell rejoined Bristol Aeroplane Company and was looking for an assistant. He interviewed Leslie Frise and employed him in 1916; Frank Barnwell would become one of Bristol's main aircraft designers until his death on 2 August 1938 in an aviation accident. Barnwell developed the 1916 Bristol F.2 Fighter with Frise's assistance.

He invented the Frise aileron, also known as the slotted aileron, in 1921, which is designed to counteract adverse yaw, which won him the Royal Aeronautical Society's Wakefield Gold Medal (for advances in aviation safety) awarded on 30 May 1933. The Frise aileron has an effect on parasitic drag so that the total drag on both wings is the same when an aircraft executes a roll.

In 1934 he developed, with Frank Barnwell, the Bristol Type 143, a monoplane with retractable undercarriage; only one prototype was made.

In 1936, when Barnwell became chief engineer, Frise became chief designer.

He worked for 32 years for Bristol retiring, as chief engineer, in 1946 on grounds of ill health.

Percival Aircraft
Frise joined Percival Aircraft in 1948 as technical director and chief engineer. He designed a naval version of the Percival Prince and the Percival Sea Prince. He also designed the Percival Provost basic trainer and a jet-powered version the Jet Provost. In 1956 he left to become Director of Special Projects with Blackburn Aircraft.

Aircraft designed

Frise was involved in the design of or lead the design team as chief engineer for the following aircraft:
 Bristol Beaufighter
 Bristol Beaufort
 Bristol Blenheim
 Bristol Brabazon
 Bristol Brigand
 Bristol Bulldog
 Bristol Freighter
 Hunting-Percival Jet Provost
 Percival Provost
 Percival Sea Prince

Personal life
Frise married in 1922 in Bristol; they had a son born in 1938 and a daughter in 1948. He died in Bristol aged 84.

Honours and awards
Frise was admitted to the Freedom of the City of London in 1948.

References

External links
 Biography
 Aviation Archive

1895 births
1979 deaths
Aircraft designers
Alumni of the University of Bristol
Aviation pioneers
Bristol Aeroplane Company
British World War I pilots
English aerospace engineers
Fellows of the Royal Aeronautical Society
People educated at Bristol Grammar School
Engineers from Bristol
Royal Naval Air Service aviators